WQGA (103.3 MHz, "103Q") is a commercial FM radio station licensed to Waycross, Georgia, and serving the Brunswick, Georgia, and Jacksonville, Florida, area.  The station is owned by iHeartMedia, Inc., through licensee iHM Licenses, LLC, and airs a Top 40 radio format.

The station airs The Kidd Kraddick Morning Show, syndicated from Westwood One.

History
The station was assigned the call letters WACL-FM on August 2, 1978.  On July 1, 1988, the station changed its call sign to WHFX, on March 22, 1996, to WFGA, on March 23, 1998, to WWSN, and on September 13, 2010, to the current WQGA.

On May 15, 2014, Qantum Communications announced that it would sell its 29 stations, including WQGA, to Clear Channel Communications (now iHeartMedia), in a transaction connected to Clear Channel's sale of WALK AM-FM in Patchogue, New York to Connoisseur Media via Qantum. The transaction was consummated on September 9, 2014.

References

External links

QGA
Radio stations established in 1978
IHeartMedia radio stations
Contemporary hit radio stations in the United States